Isha Keskar (born 11 November 1991) is an Indian film and television actress who works primarily in Marathi films. She is known for her lead roles in the Marathi serials Jai Malhar and Mazhya Navryachi Bayko.

Early Life 
Isha Keskar is from Pune, Maharashtra. She completed her schooling from Sinhagad School in Pune and graduate in psychology from Symbiosis College, Pune.

Career 
Keskar started career with 2013 Marathi film We are On!  Houn Jau Dya. Later in 2014, she played the role of Banu in the mythological series Jai Malhar, which was a hit with the audience. She was also acted famous marathi family drama series Mazhya Navryachi Bayko. In 2023, she is playing the lead role in the movie Sarla Ek Koti.

Filmography

Films

Television

Web series

Personal life 
Keskar has been in a relationship with Rishi Saxena of Kahe Diya Pardes for the past few years.

References

External links 

  

Indian actresses
1991 births
Living people